EA201 series also known as Kereta Rel Listrik Indonesia 
(abbreviated as KRL-I) was the first train assembled entirely in Indonesia. It was assembled at Industri Kereta Api in 2001, and began operating in 2003. Initially EA201 series often operated as the Serpong Express from – and Pakuan Express from Tanah Abang–, but in 2007 EA201 series was operated for the Ciliwung Ring. Between 1 December 2012 and the end of service in 2014, EA201 series was operated as Eject service of – due to the elimination of the Ciliwung route due to the implementation of the Loop Line pattern.

Formation

References

Electric multiple units of Indonesia

1500 V DC multiple units